Gentleman Thief is a 2001 British television film loosely based on the A. J. Raffles stories by E. W. Hornung. It stars Nigel Havers as A. J. Raffles and Michael French as Ellis Bride, an original character who appears as Raffles's sidekick instead of Bunny Manders, Raffles's sidekick in Hornung's stories. It aired on 24 June 2001 on BBC One.

Plot
Gentleman thief A.J. Raffles finds himself caught up in murder following the theft of a ruby.

Production
The television film was written by Matthew Graham and directed by Justin Hardy. The executive producer was Mal Young and the producer was Victoria Fea. The music was composed by Christian Vassie.

References

External links

2001 films
Films directed by Justin Hardy
2000s English-language films
British television films
Works based on A. J. Raffles